Tomberg is a Brussels Metro station on the eastern branch of line 1 (line 1B prior to 4 April 2009).

The station opened on 20 January 1976. Until 1982 (when the line was extended to Alma), it was the eastern terminus of line 1B.

References

Brussels metro stations
Railway stations opened in 1976
Woluwe-Saint-Lambert